Mbarara District is a district in South Western Uganda. In 2019 Uganda cabinet approved part of Mbarara the then Mbarara municipality to be upgraded to a city status in July 2020.

Location

Mbarara District is bordered by Ibanda District to the north, Kiruhura District to the east, Isingiro District to the southeast, Rwampara District to the southwest, Sheema District to the west and Buhweju District to the northwest. The coordinates of the district are:00 36S, 30 36E.

Overview
Mbarara District is part of the Ankole sub-region. The districts that comprise Ankole include: (a) Buhweju District (b) Bushenyi District (c) Ibanda District (d) Isingiro District (e) Kiruhura District (f) Mbarara District
(g) Mitooma District (h) Ntungamo District (i) Rubirizi District (j) Sheema District.

The area covered by the above districts constituted the traditional Ankole Kingdom. In 1967, Milton Obote abolished the traditional kingdoms in Uganda. When Yoweri Museveni re-established them in 1993, Ankole did not re-constitute itself.

Mbarara district consists of one municipality (Mbarara Municipality), and nineteen rural sub-counties, organized into two counties.

The district is subdivided into one municipal council, Mbarara Municipality, and 13 sub-counties, namely: 1. Kashari 2. Bubaare 3. Bukiro 4. Kagongi 5. Kakiika 6. Kashare 7. Rubaya 8. Rubindi 9. Rwanyamahembe 10. Biharwe 11. Kakoba 12. Kamukuzi 13. Nyamitanga.

Population
In 1991, the national census put the population of the district at about 267,500. The 2002 national census estimated the district population at about 361,500, with an estimated growth rate of about 2.2%. Of these, 51% were female and 49% were male. 55% of the district population are aged between 0 and 18 years. In 2012, the district population was estimated at approximately 445,600.

Economic activities
As is the case with the majority of Ugandan districts, agriculture is the mainstay of the economy of Mbarara District. Both crops and livestock are raised in the district, primarily on a subsistence level, but several commercial farms are located in the district. Crops grown include:

 Matooke
 Sweet Bananas
 Beans
 Sweet Potatoes
 Irish Potatoes
 Millet
 Cabbage
 Tomatoes
 Pineapples
 Avocado
 Passionfruit
 Papaya
 Mangoes

The livestock raised in the district includes:

 Ankole cattle
 Exotic cattle 
 Hybrid cattle
 Goats
 Sheep
 Pigs
 Rabbits
 Chicken
 Ducks
 Guineafowl
 Turkeys

Tourism 
The main tourist attractions in Mbarara District include the following:

Lake Mburo National Park

Lake Mburo National Park is located about 30 km east of Mbarara Town. The park size is approximately 370 km2 and was named after Lake Mburo which occupies about 20% of its total area.  The park is home to zebras, impalas, elands, leopards, hippos, hyenas, Defassa waterbucks, buffaloes and about 350 bird species.

Lake Nakivale

Lake Nakivale is located about 40 kilometers south-east of Mbarara town. The lake's water body, sandy beaches and expansive open grounds make it an attractive spot to tourists.

River Rwizi

River Rwizi supplies both domestic and commercial water to Mbarara town. The river is also an important ecosystem and acts as a tourist site for safari tourists on their way to and from the south western part of Uganda.

Community health
In Uganda, Mbarara district has consistently been rated among the top 20 districts in the improvement of community health. The district has attained a penta vaccine coverage of 86.4%, 66% deliveries of pregnant mothers in health units, a 1.3% out-patient department (OPD) per capita utilization, and a comprehensive HIV/AIDS service coverage of 85% with a prevalence rate of 7%, sanitation coverage of 97% and reduction in sanitation related diseases occurrence by 40%.

See also

References

External links
Mbarara District Information Portal
 Mbarara: HIV Infection Worries Medics

 
Districts of Uganda
Western Region, Uganda